Other Edens is an anthology edited by Christopher Evans and Robert Holdstock published in 1987.

Plot summary
Other Edens is a collection of 14 British science fiction/fantasy stories.

Reception
Dave Langford reviewed Other Edens for White Dwarf #93, and stated that "excellent stuff by nifty authors from Aldiss to Watson."

Reviews
Review by David V. Barrett (1987) in Vector 139
Review by Faren Miller (1987) in Locus, #322 November 1987
Review by Amy Thomson (1987) in Locus, #322 November 1987
Review by Andy Robertson (1987) in Interzone, #22 Winter 1987
Review by John Clute (1987) in Foundation, #40 Summer 1987

References

1987 novels